Douglas A. Powell (born May 16, 1963 Albany, Georgia) is an American poet.

Life and career
Powell lived in various places growing up, then graduated high school from Lindhurst High School in Olivehurst, California.  He then worked in a number of jobs before eventually settling in Santa Rosa, California, where he attended Sonoma State University. He earned a bachelor's degree in 1991 and a master's in 1993. Not long after completing his graduate work at Sonoma State, he entered the Iowa Writer's Workshop at the University of Iowa.

In 1996, he graduated from Iowa and began a career as a poet and university professor. Powell has taught at a number of different universities, including Columbia University, Sonoma State University, San Francisco State University, and Harvard University, where he served as the Briggs-Copeland Lecturer in Poetry. In 2004, Powell left Harvard for The University of San Francisco, where he teaches in the English department.

Awards and recognition 
In addition to serving as the Briggs-Copeland Lecturer at Harvard (itself a recognition of both creative and scholarly talent), Powell has won the Lyric Poetry Award from the Poetry Society of America, a grant for the National Endowment for the Arts, and a Paul Engle Fellowship. His second collection, Lunch, was a finalist for the National Poetry Series, and his third book, Cocktails, was a finalist for the National Book Critics Circle Award for Poetry.

On February 3, 2010, after the publication of Chronic in 2009, Claremont Graduate University announced that Powell had won its prestigious Kingsley Tufts Poetry Award. Chronic also won the 2009 Northern California Book Award and the 2009 California Book Award.

He is a 2011 Guggenheim Fellow.

His poetry collection Useless Landscape, or A Guide for Boys won the National Book Critics Circle Award (2012).

In 2019, Powell received the John Updike Award from the American Academy of Arts and Letters.

Work 
Considered by some an experimental poet, Powell mixes both conventional and non-conventional techniques. For example, his early poems do not have titles; the first lines serve as the poems' working titles. He also does not capitalize the first letter of a new sentence; in this sense, he is reminiscent of E. E. Cummings. His work often moves back and forth between popular culture like movies and music and more complicated themes like religion and AIDS; he uses numerous rhetorical devices, especially puns, as bridges between these two spheres of experience. Powell's first three books of poems are considered a kind of trilogy on the AIDS epidemic.

Writing in The New York Times, critic Stephen Burt said of Powell's work, "No accessible poet of his generation is half as original, and no poet as original is this accessible."

Bibliography

Poetry
 
 
 Cocktails, Graywolf Press, 2004, 
 Chronic, Graywolf Press, 2009, 
 Useless Landscape, or A Guide for Boys, Graywolf Press, 2012,

Anthologies

Translation
Cocktails, Luxbooks, 2009,  - A bilingual selection from Powell's four collections has been published in Germany.

Prose
D.A. Powell, David Trinidad, By Myself: An Autobiography, Turtle Point Press, 2009

References

External links 
Two poems in Triquarterly
Eleven poems by D. A. Powell at the Poetry Foundation
Interview with D. A. Powell in Nashville Review
Doug Powell page at the Here Comes Everybody Blog
A Poetry Reading by Powell from The New York Times
Panic in the Year Zero, a new poem for Harvard Class Day, "Panic in the Year Zero", May 26, 2010.
Stuart A. Rose Manuscript, Archives, and Rare Book Library, Emory University: D.A. Powell papers

American male poets
1963 births
Living people
Iowa Writers' Workshop alumni
American gay writers
American LGBT poets
Poets from Georgia (U.S. state)
21st-century American poets
21st-century American male writers
21st-century LGBT people
Gay poets